This is a list of compositions by Danny Elfman for film, television, stage and the concert hall.

For a list of recordings, see Danny Elfman discography, and for Elfman's work as lead singer/songwriter of Oingo Boingo, see Oingo Boingo discography.

Film scores
The following list consists of select films for which Danny Elfman composed the score and/or songs.

1980s

1990s

2000s

2010s

2020s

Additional film work

In addition to his feature scores, Elfman has supplied thematic material and additional music for films scored by others (theme only unless otherwise noted):

Elfman composed the music for the Hollywood Pictures logo in 1991, and an excerpt from his main title for Sommersby was subsequently used as the logo music for Regency (the company that made Sommersby) beginning in 1994.

Concert and stage works
The following list consists of select works composed for the stage and concert hall.

Television

Elfman has written the theme music and occasional episodic scores for several television series, including:

On October 30, 2015, PBS's "Live from Lincoln Center" broadcast Danny Elfman's Music from the Films of Tim Burton, for which Elfman won Outstanding Music Direction at the 68th Primetime Emmy Awards.

In 2019 selections from his score to the film Midnight Run were used in the third season of Netflix's Stranger Things, including "Stairway Chase" in episodes 5 and 6, and "Wild Ride" and "Package Deal" in episode 6.

Video games

Miscellaneous

1987: Music for Sally Cruikshank's Face Like A Frog animated short (suite included on the 1990 [[Music for a Darkened Theatre: Film & Television Music Volume One|Music for a Darkened Theatre, Vol. 1]] compilation).
1991: Music for Nike's "Barkley Superhero" animated television commercial (included on the 1996 Music for a Darkened Theatre, Vol. 2 compilation).
1996: Music for a 1996/97 Nissan television advertising campaign.
1998: Music for a 1998/99 Lincoln-Mercury television advertising campaign.
1998: Provided part-composed, part-sampled music for Luigi Serafini's solo exhibition il Teatro della Pittura at the Fondazione Mudima di Milano in Milan, Italy.
1998: For Gus Van Sant's shot-for-shot Psycho remake, Elfman and Steve Bartek adapted the original score composed by Bernard Herrmann.
2000: Music for Tim Burton's "Stainboy" animated internet series commissioned by Shockwave.com (selections released on Warner Bros. Records' The Danny Elfman & Tim Burton 25th Anniversary Music Box in 2010).
2002: Music for Honda's "Power of Dreams" advertising campaign, the first cinema commercial to be shot in the IMAX format.
2006: Elfman's "Overeager Overture" commemorating conductor John Mauceri's tenure with the Hollywood Bowl Orchestra premiered September 15, 2006, at the Hollywood Bowl, conducted by Mauceri.
2006: Provided music for Erik Sanko's first feature-length marionette performance The Fortune Teller.
2009: Incidental music for the Tim Burton exhibition at the Museum of Modern Art in 2009-2010 (selections released on Warner Bros. Records' The Danny Elfman & Tim Burton 25th Anniversary Music Box in 2010).
2013: Composed the music and provided the English-language vocals for the Hong Kong Disneyland attraction Mystic Manor.
2016: Scored the "Making of an Oscar" animation which opened the 88th Academy Awards.
2016: Composed atonal "horror" music for the short Funny or Die video "Trump Stalks Clinton," which used footage from the Second U.S. Presidential debate.
2019: Elfman's Batman and Flash themes briefly appeared in the Supergirl episode "Crisis on Infinite Earths: Part One" and in The Flash episode "Crisis on Infinite Earths: Part Three" respectively, both part of the Arrowverse.
2020: Re-recorded and released a "nursery rhyme" version of his 1982 Oingo Boingo song "Running on a Treadmill" while under quarantine from the coronavirus pandemic.
2020: Scored the 10-minute video "Joe Biden," which introduced Joe Biden's acceptance of the presidential candidacy nomination at the 2020 Democratic National Convention. 
2021: Released Big Mess, Elfman's first "rock record in 27 years" and first solo record since 1984's So-Lo.
2021: Elfman's Batman theme for the DC Animated Universe briefly appeared during the Warner 300 presentation scene in the Looney Tunes film Space Jam: A New Legacy.
2021: Elfman's Spider-Man theme briefly appeared in the Marvel Cinematic Universe film Spider-Man: No Way Home.
2023: An orchestrated rendition of Elfman's Batman theme is heard in the official trailer of the DC Extended Universe film The Flash.

Notes

References 

Elfman, Danny
List of compositions